Homolagoa is a monotypic moth genus of the family Noctuidae (the owlet moths). Its only species, Homolagoa grotelliformis, is found in North America. Both the genus and species were first described by William Barnes and James Halliday McDunnough in 1912.

The MONA or Hodges number for Homolagoa grotelliformis is 9043.

References

Further reading

 
 
 
 
 
 
 
 
 

Amphipyrinae
Articles created by Qbugbot
Moths described in 1912
Monotypic moth genera